Forks of the Road may refer to:
 Altaville, California
 Moravian Falls, North Carolina

See also
 Road Forks, New Mexico
 Fork in the road, a disambiguation page